Variety may refer to:

Arts and entertainment

Entertainment formats 
 Variety (radio)
 Variety show, in theater and television

Films 
 Variety (1925 film), a German silent film directed by Ewald Andre Dupont
 Variety (1935 film), a British musical film
 Variety (1935 German film), a German drama film
 Variety (1971 film), a Spanish drama film
 Variety (1983 film), an American independent film

Music 
 Variety (Family Fodder album), tenth studio album by Family fodder
 Variety (Les Rita Mitsouko album), seventh studio album by Les Rita Mitsouko
 Variety (Mariya Takeuchi album), sixth studio album by Mariya Takeuchi
 Variety (Tokyo Jihen album), third studio album by Tokyo Jihen
 Variety Records, a short-lived US record label that was produced by Brunswick Records

Other uses in arts and entertainment 
 Variety (magazine), an entertainment industry newspaper
 Variety Film Reviews is the 24-volume hardcover reprint of the magazine feature film reviews
 Variety Television Network, an American former digital subchannel
 "Variety", a 2002 Oz television episode

Botany and horticulture

Businesses and organizations 
 Variety, the Children's Charity, international charity to help children with special needs
 Variety Cruises, a cruise line
 Variety (magazine), an entertainment industry newspaper
 Variety Wholesalers, a retail store owner operating in the southeastern United States

Mathematics and systems
 Algebraic variety, the set of solutions of a system of polynomial equations
 Variety (cybernetics), the number of possible states of a system or of an element of the system
 Variety (universal algebra), classes of algebraic structures defined by equations in universal algebra

Other uses 
 Variety (linguistics), a specific form of a language (or of a dialect continuum)
 Variety, a term in coin collecting
 Variety Jones, pseudonym of a person closely involved with the founding of the darknet market Silk Road

See also
 Variability (disambiguation)
 Variant (disambiguation)
 Variation (disambiguation)